Julio Ruiz de Alda Miqueleiz (7 October 1897 in Estella, Navarre – 23 August 1936 in Madrid) was a Spanish aviator and founder of the Falange. 

He joined the Army at the age of 15 and developed an interest in planes. He was the co-pilot (with Ramón Franco) of the Plus Ultra as it completed a transatlantic flight in 1926.  The Plus  Ultra departed from Palos de la Frontera, in Huelva, Spain on 22 January and arrived in Buenos Aires, Argentina on 26 January. It stopped over at Gran Canaria, Cape Verde, Pernambuco, Rio de Janeiro and Montevideo. The 10,270 km journey was completed in  59 hours and 39 minutes. 

In 1931, along with José Antonio Primo de Rivera (Marquess of his birthplace), he was a founding member of the Falange movement. He was shot without a trial by an anarchist militia in Madrid's Cárcel Modelo prison on 23 August 1936, after the beginning of the civil war.

External links
The Flight of the Plus Ultra
The Plus Ultra at the  museum in Luján

1897 births
1936 deaths
People from Navarre
Spanish Falangists
Spanish aviators
Spanish military personnel
Spanish politicians
Spanish people who died in prison custody
Prisoners who died in Spanish detention
People killed by the Second Spanish Republic
Executed Spanish people
Transatlantic flight
Spanish syndicalists